Naghma Shaperai (Pashto: نغمه ښاپېرۍ, born 1 January 1951 in Paktia Province, Afghanistan) is an Afghan singer who started her career in the early 1980s. She sung along her ex-husband, Mangal, during the 1980s and early 1990s. Naghma sings mostly in Pashto, but has also recorded in the Dari Persian language. She is considered to be folklore female artist in Afghanistan and continues to be the voice and face of Pashtun traditional music.

Biography

Naghma was born as Shaperai (Pashto: ښاپېرۍ meaning Head Fairy) on 1 January 1951 in paktia Afghanistan,She was the eldest daughter in a family of five boys and three girls. Her father's name was Syed Suleiman Shah and her mother is Bibi Mashala. Her father died when Naghma was five years old. As a young girl, she developed an interest in music. At sixteen she moved to Kabul with her paternal uncle. She continued her secondary education at Rabia Balkhi Lece where she was performing in the girl's band as a vocalist. A year before finishing her high school she married Mangal, an already popular Pashto singer from Laghman Province, and left school to advance her musical career. They were instant celebrities, recording hits that are famous to this day. Her early songs were based on southern Afghan music, most of which were folkloric in nature.

Eventually they settled in Islamabad, Pakistan. There, they became very successful with an enthusiastic crowd of Afghan exiles who were nostalgic for their native music. Their financial situation by this time had improved significantly. In 2000, they left Pakistan and immigrated to the United States.

The couple connected with the Afghan community of Northern California. In 2006 they divorced. Naghma remarried after her divorce to a man from Logar Province.

In March 2014, she became the first Afghan to receive the Tamgha-e-Imtiaz and the Pride of Performance, the highest Pakistani Presidential Awards handed to artists, sportsmen, scientists, and writers. It was a proud moment for Naghma who has always been a strong voice for the Afghan refugees in Pakistan. Naghma encourages Afghan refugees to try and go back to Afghanistan through her aid work and music to rebuild the country.

Discography
She has recorded over 500 songs in a period of 32 years in Afghanistan, Pakistan and also in the United States.
This list is incomplete

Album: Bachi Hamsaya

  Bachi Hamsaya 
  Aros 
  O Bacha 
  Maida Maida 
  Nazi Jan 
  Ba Yin Sazi Mahali 
  Ghataghani 
  Shekesta Chelamey
  Imroz 
  Tu Ra Meparastam 
  O Dilbar Janim 
  O Bacha 
  Jama Narinje 

Album: Best Of Naghma

  Charsi Halika Stargi 
  Janana ke Pashton 
  Halka Daroghjan Mee 
  Raghlay Yama Damor 
  Za Ba Gidi Rawdim 
  Chita Che Zi Mat 
  Raza Da Zandgi Sra 
  Yara Rana Wrak Nashi 
  Janana Rasha Da Shamali 
  Hagha Sra Oshan 
  Allah Wi Zamazda 

Album: Kabul Nazaneen

  Salam Afghanistan 
  Delbar Jan 
  Ghataghani 
  Yaram Nest 
  Darbigeri 
  O Dilbar Janam 
  Nazi Jan 
  O Bachi Afghan 
  Maida Maida Baran 
  Em Roz Che Roz Ast 

Album: O Khoda Jan

  Az America Wa Alman 
  O Khuda Jan 
  Sharshara Baran 
  Shab Amadam 
  Bebe Roko Jan 
  Kashki Ma 
  Man Dokhtari Sherazam 
  Mara Az Ashiqi Bas 
  Mohabat 
  Pesta Forosh 

Popular Singles:

  Mazdigar De Ka Nade 
  O Bacha Jane Bacha 
  Lalaya Hawa Baza 
  Kandahar Halika 
  Adam Khana Charsi 
  Mohabbat 
  Mohabbat (Slow Version) 
  Lalo Lalo 
  Mala Chal Ne Razi 
  Akh Janan Me Laro 
  Zma Afghanistana
  Loya Khudaya 
  Orbal Chapa Kra Bya Rasta 
  Akhshe na ni na (Attan De Gada Da)
  Mubarak Di Sha Akhtar 
  Lalai de 
  Dilbar Zalim Zalim 
  Wa Grana 
  Nor e Newranawo 
  Ay Da Watan Da Abay Roka Zoya 
  Afghani Mashoma 

Contributing artist
 The Rough Guide To The Music Of Afghanistan, 2010

References

External links

1964 births
Living people
20th-century Afghan women singers
Recipients of the Pride of Performance
Pashtun women
Afghan expatriate musicians in Pakistan
Recipients of Tamgha-e-Imtiaz
21st-century Afghan women singers